The 1954 United States Senate election in Maine was held on September 13, 1954. Incumbent Republican U.S. Senator Margaret Chase Smith was re-elected to a second term over Democrat Paul Fullam.

Republican primary

Candidates
Robert L. Jones
 Margaret Chase Smith, U.S. Senator since 1949

Results

Democratic primary

Candidates
Paul Fullam

Results
Fullam was unopposed for the Democratic nomination.

General election

Results

See also 
 1954 United States Senate elections

References

Maine
1954